SMTU may refer to:
 Société montpelliéraine de transport urbain, the predecessor to Transports de l'agglomération de Montpellier, the public transport company in Montpellier, France
 , a predecessor of TUSSAM, the company responsible for managing the service buses and trams urban city of Seville, Spain
 Singapore Malay Teachers' Union, a public sector union affiliated with the National Trades Union Congress